Sir Thomas Skipwith, 2nd Baronet (ca. 165215 June 1710) was a Member of Parliament, and theatrical manager in London in the late 17th and early 18th century.

Family
Skipwith was the son of Sir Thomas Skipwith, 1st Baronet and his wife Elizabeth Lathom daughter of Ralph Lathom of Upminster, Essex. He married Margaret, daughter of George Brydges, 6th Baron Chandos, after being admitted to Gray's Inn on 5 August 1670.

Career
After a brief military career, Skipwith was elected a Member of Parliament for Malmsbury in 1696.

On 31 March 1682, Dame Mary Davenant, widow of Sir William Davenant, sold Skipwith a half share in the Duke's Company. He later formed a partnership with his late father's clerk, Christopher Rich, to manage the Theatre Royal, Drury Lane. During this time the theatre ceased performing serious dramatic works in favour of lighter entertainments, leading the noted actor Thomas Betterton to petition the Lord Chamberlain in protest.

Personal life
Skipwith was parodied by Delarivier Manley as 'Sir Peter Vainlove' in the Adventures of Rivella published in 1714. She described him as having:

Manley also described his pursuit of two mistresses, and Skipworth's philandering led to him living apart from his wife on at least one occasion. In 1707, Isabella Wentworth, a Lady of the Bedchamber to Queen Anne, wrote privately of his return:

Skipwith left substantial sums to his housekeeper, Susanna Gurney, and her daughter, Charlotte. Historian D. W. Hayton, who describes Skipwith as 'an engaging roué', suggests this 'strengthens the suspicion' that Gurney was also his mistress, and her daughter his illegitimate child.

References

1650s births
1710 deaths
17th-century English people
English MPs 1695–1698
Baronets in the Baronetage of England